The UAZ Simba is a UAZ designed 4×2 or 4×4 wheel drive minivan concept. The Simba has a wheelbase of 3,000 mm and is a combination of a 7-9-person van and an SUV. It shares many common components with UAZ-3162 SUV. Simba family prototypes were shown at the Moscow Auto Salon in 1999–2005, but did not reach production for financial reasons. 
The Simba was based on an enhanced UAZ Simbir platform. The Simba family provided for the modification of a long 3000 mm wheelbase which contained a 250 mm rear overhang. The Simba's roof was 460 mm taller than the Simbir's, which allowed to increase the capacity up to 13 passengers. UAZ-3165 provided UFG 249.10 capacity of 132 hp or turbo diesel ZMZ-5143.10 capacity of 98 hp and a manual 5-speed gearbox. The gross vehicle weight (GVR) was 3 tons, maximum speed 142-160 km/h.

Several prototypes have been presented at the car shows:

 UAZ-3165 - minivan with ZMZ-409 motor
 UAZ-Combi - minivan with a high plastic roof
 UAZ-27722 - ambulance
 UAZ-2365 - flatbed truck

Notes

See also
 UAZ-452 - UAZ minibus
 GAZ Sobol - GAZ minivan

External links
 Simba pictures at UAZBuka

2000s cars
UAZ
Cars of Russia